The 332nd Static Infantry Division was raised over the winter of 1940-1941 and served on coastal defense duties in Brittany and along the Channel coast until early 1943. In October 1942 the division was reorganized as the 332nd Infantry Division (with improved mobility and offensive capabilities), and in the spring of 1943 it was transferred to the Eastern Front; it was disbanded after the Battle of Kursk.

Commanding officers 
 Generalleutnant Heinrich Recke, 14 November 1940
 Generalleutnant Hans Kessel, 6 August 1941 
 General der Infanterie Walter Melzer, 17 December 1942 
 Generalleutnant Hans Schäfer, 1 January 1943
 Generalmajor Adolf Trowitz, 5 June 1943

Structure
The 332nd Static Infantry Division had the following units, these were:
676th Infantry Regiment 
677th Infantry Regiment 
678th Infantry Regiment 
332nd Artillery Regiment 
332nd Engineer Battalion
332nd Field Replacement Battalion 
332nd Cycling Detachment 
332nd Panzerjäger Battalion
332nd Intelligence Department 
332nd Supply Troops

References

Infantry divisions of Germany during World War II
Military units and formations established in 1940
Military units and formations disestablished in 1943